This is a list of countries or dependencies by income inequality metrics, including Gini coefficients. The Gini coefficient is a number between 0 and 1, where 0 corresponds with perfect equality (where everyone has the same income) and 1 corresponds with perfect inequality (where one person has all the incomeand everyone else has no income).

Income distribution can vary greatly from wealth distribution in a country (see List of countries by wealth inequality). Income from black market economic activity is not included and is the subject of current economic research.

UN, World Bank and CIA list – income ratios and Gini indices 
Row numbers are static. Other columns are sortable. This allows ranking of any column.

Key:
R/P 10% The ratio of the average income of the richest 10% to the poorest 10%.
R/P 20% The ratio of the average income of the richest 20% to the poorest 20%.
Gini Gini index, a quantified representation of a nation's Lorenz curve. A Gini index of 0% expresses perfect equality, while index of 100% expresses maximal inequality.
UN Data from the United Nations Development Programme.
CIA Data from the Central Intelligence Agency's The World Factbook.

EU27 countries

OECD countries

Gini coefficient, before taxes and transfers

Source:

Gini coefficient, after taxes and transfers

Source:

See also
 List of countries by inequality-adjusted Human Development Index
 List of countries by percentage of population living in poverty
 List of countries by share of income of the richest one percent

Notes

References

Further reading
  This book released with two titles, depending on country of publication. However, the ISBN remains the same.
  USA's Gini index is now .482 according to Federal Reserve Governor Lael Brainard.

External links
 Global Peace Index Map of Gini data for 2007–2010
 Shadow economies all over the world : new estimates for 162 countries from 1999 to 2007. Friedrich Schneider, Andreas Buehn, Claudio E. Montenegro. July 2010. World Bank.
 Allianz Global Wealth Report 2018.

Income equality

 List
Global inequality